The 1894 Kansas Jayhawks football team represented the University of Kansas in the Western Interstate University Football Association (WIUFA) during the 1894 college football season. In their first season under head coach Hector Cowan, the Jayhawks compiled a 2–3–1 record (1–2 against conference opponents), finished third in the conference, and were outscored by all opponents by a combined total of 82 to 78. The Jayhawks played their home games at McCook Field in Lawrence, Kansas. O. K. Williamson was the team captain.

Schedule

References

Kansas
Kansas Jayhawks football seasons
Kansas Jayhawks football